Rafah Elementary Co-Ed “B” School (مدرسة رفح الابتدائية كو-إد بي) is a school in Rafah, a town in the Gaza Strip, run by the United Nations Relief and Works Agency for Palestine Refugees (UNRWA). It stands 800 meters from the border with Israel and has been damaged by weapons fire on several occasions.

On January 31, 2005, pupil Noran Iyad Deeb was killed by a bullet said to have been fired from the area of the Israeli-controlled border. A second pupil was injured in the hand.

References

Primary schools in the State of Palestine
Buildings and structures in the Gaza Strip
Schools in the Gaza Strip